Meneguzzi is a surname and may refer to:

Elisa Angela Meneguzzi (1901-1941), Italian Roman Catholic
Paolo Meneguzzi (born 1976), Swiss Italian singer